Ugly Casanova was an American indie rock band signed to Sub Pop Records. The band has released one album,  Sharpen Your Teeth.

Career
According to the Ugly Casanova website, in 1998 a man named Edgar E. Graham, a.k.a. "Ugly Casanova", impressed himself upon the band Modest Mouse while backstage at a concert in Denver, Colorado. After some prodding, he shared his work with the band and began performing it early before shows while some people were milling around. Whenever he completed these performances, he retreated quickly with a look of anger and shame. After a time, a few small recordings were created, after which Edgar vanished. Isaac Brock of Modest Mouse later recorded his songs in hopes that Graham would resurface in the music scene.
Isaac Brock has since revealed that Edgar Graham was "a fiction thing that [Brock] started awhile back to eliminate [himself] from the band," to escape having to do interviews. Two pieces of evidence exist that suggest that the story was false: Modest Mouse's 1997 EP The Fruit That Ate Itself was credited to having been under the production company Ugly Casanova, which suggested it was a name Brock made up to retain creative control and publishing rights to his music while under a major label. Secondly, "Ugly Casanova" was the title of a song Brock wrote around 1993. The band lineup as of the 180° South: Conquerors of the Useless soundtrack consists of Isaac Brock, Eric Judy, Tom Peloso, and Joe Plummer of Modest Mouse, as well as Clay Jones, who worked as an engineer on Modest Mouse's fifth album, We Were Dead Before The Ship Even Sank. The band's lineup for Sharpen Your Teeth consisted of Isaac Brock, Tyler Reilly (In the Drink), Tim Rutili (Califone, Red Red Meat), Pall Jenkins (The Black Heart Procession), John Orth (Holopaw), and Brian Deck (Red Red Meat).

Compared with Modest Mouse's music, Ugly Casanova's music is distinguished by its more stripped-down sound. Ugly Casanova mixes indie rock with hints of country and folk, ranging from acoustic ballads (Hotcha Girls) to more bizarre with piercing vocals (Diamonds on the Face of Evil). The mood created by Ugly Casanova's songs reflects the enigma that is its creator, Edgar Graham.

Two tracks released by Ugly Casanova, "Baby's Clean Conscience" and "Parasites", appear earlier as unreleased demos of Modest Mouse in the Paracite Sessions purportedly recorded in 1993 at Calvin Johnson's Dub Narcotic Studio. In 1997 the fourth Magic Eye Single (each one named after its color of vinyl) included To Roads To Go  on the apparently now defunct Magic Eye Records, however, this was an entirely different incarnation of Ugly Casanova of Isaac Brock, Steve Dukage, and John Atkins of 764-Hero.

Rumors of new Ugly Casanova material have come and gone over recent years, but no substantial news regarding the band had surfaced until it was announced that Ugly Casanova would contribute to the soundtrack for the 2010 documentary 180 Degrees South: Conquerors of the Useless.  The soundtrack featured eight new Ugly Casanova songs as well as a redone version of "Hotcha Girls" from Sharpen Your Teeth.

Discography

Studio albums
Sharpen Your Teeth (Sub Pop Records, 2002)

Other releases

"Magic Eye Single No. 4: White" (Magic Eye Records, 1997)
"Diggin Holes" b/w "Babys Clean Conscience" (Sub Pop Records, 2002)
"180 Degrees South: Conquerors of the Useless Soundtrack" (Republic Records, 2010)

References

External links
 Portfolio of John Orth
 Sub Pop Ugly Casanova Page
 An article about Ugly Casanova
 "Who is Edgar Graham?"
 An interview with Isaac Brock
 Information regarding the band's current lineup

Indie rock musical groups from Washington (state)
Sub Pop artists
People from Issaquah, Washington